Stepan Falkovsky (born 18 December 1996) is a Belarusian professional ice hockey defenceman playing with the SKA Saint Petersburg organization of the Kontinental Hockey League (KHL). He was selected by the Calgary Flames in the seventh round (186th overall) at the 2016 NHL Entry Draft.

Playing career
Falkovsky played in his native Belarus, as a youth with Yunost Minsk. He made his professional debut as a 16-year-old in the Vysshaya Liga in 2013. In moving to North America to continue his development at a higher level, Falkovsky played major junior with the Ottawa 67's of the Ontario Hockey League (OHL).

Falkovsky was selected in the seventh round (186th overall) by the Calgary Flames in the 2016 NHL Entry Draft. He was signed to an AHL/ECHL contract with the Flames' affiliate, the Stockton Heat on 5 October 2016. Pushed down the depth chart, Falkovsky was rooted to the ECHL for the duration of the 2016–17 season, recording 21 goals in 54 games with the Adirondack Thunder.

As an unsigned prospect of the Flames, on 1 July 2017, Falkovsky signed as a free agent to a three-year, entry-level contract with the Los Angeles Kings. On 21 November 2018, Falkovsky was traded by the Kings to the Minnesota Wild in exchange for Pavel Jenyš. He played 5 games with the Iowa Wild in the AHL, before he was reassigned to the ECHL, moving to the Wild's affiliate, the Allen Americans. On March 8, 2019, Falkovsky left the Americans and was returned with the permission of the Minnesota Wild to former ECHL club, the Monarchs, at the trade deadline.

At the conclusion of his entry-level contract with the Wild, Falkovsky left North America to return to Belarus, securing an initial trial contract with HC Dinamo Minsk of the KHL on 4 August 2020. In the 2020–21 season, Falkovsky was signed to a one-year contract, breaking out with 8 goals and 20 points through 37 regular season games. 

On 16 June 2021, Falkovsky was traded by Dinamo Minsk to SKA Saint Petersburg, in exchange for Lukas Bengtsson. He was signed to a two-year contract extension to remain with SKA through 2023.

Career statistics

Regular season and playoffs

International

References

External links
 

1996 births
Living people
Adirondack Thunder players
Allen Americans players
Belarusian ice hockey defencemen
Calgary Flames draft picks
HC Dinamo Minsk players
Iowa Wild players
Manchester Monarchs (ECHL) players
Ice hockey people from Minsk
Ontario Reign (AHL) players
Ottawa 67's players
SKA Saint Petersburg players
Yunost Minsk players
Belarusian expatriate ice hockey people
Belarusian expatriate sportspeople in the United States
Belarusian expatriate sportspeople in Canada
Belarusian expatriate sportspeople in Russia
Expatriate ice hockey players in the United States
Expatriate ice hockey players in Canada
Expatriate ice hockey players in Russia